The Grumbleweeds are an award winning British comedy band, performing music and comedy. They were mostly popular on radio and television in the 1980s, including The Grumbleweeds Radio Show which ran from 1979 to 1988 on BBC Radio 2Graham Walker Dies, The Scottish Daily Record. Retrieved 4 June 2013 and a later television incarnation (also known initially as "The Grumbleweeds Radio Show").

History
The band formed in 1962 in Leeds and practised at Stainbeck Youth Club, Meanwood under the name Tony Dale (or Dean) and the Wanderers. They played under this name at the "Battle of the Bands" (organised by a Leeds-based newspaper) at the Queens Hall, Leeds (an all nighter) on the same night on 28 June 1963 that the Beatles played this venue as second on the bill to Acker Bilk and his Jazzmen. They turned professional following success on the television talent show Opportunity Knocks.

In the late 1960s and early 1970s the band released several records, none of which made the UK charts, however their fortunes improved when they were commissioned to star in a BBC children's television series, The Coal Hole Club, in 1974. Continuing to perform to packed venues around the UK, BBC radio producer Mike Craig spotted them at the Batley Variety Club and went on to produce several series of "The Grumbleweeds Radio Show" for Radio 2 throughout the 1980s.

Brothers Albert and Carl Sutcliffe left the group in 1987. Maurice Lee left the group in 1998 and the remaining members continued to perform as a duo, up until Graham Walker's death in 2013.

With the addition of stand-up comedian James Brandon, The Grumbleweeds redeveloped the act, with Robin Colvill assuming the role of the rough-and-ready sidekick to Brandon's smooth straight man. In 2017 the group embarked on another UK tour, supported by vocalist Lisa Jane Kelsey. The following year, comedian Mike Lancaster joined the tour, which ran for a further 12 months throughout the UK.

Album discography
 In a Teknikolor Dreem (album, 1971)
 Al Bum (album, 1976)
 Comedy From their Radio 2 Series (BBC 1979)
 Worravagorrinmepocket (MFP 1981)
 Let the Good Times Roll (K-Tel 1986)

The Grumbleweeds recorded the song 'String of Beads' to celebrate Leeds United's 1972 FA Cup Final.

Personnel
Current members
 Robin Stewart Colvill - Vocals (1962–present, (born 8 August 1944, Leeds)
 James Brandon - Vocals (2014–present)

Former members
 Graham Paul Walker (1962-2013); (born 17 May 1944, Leeds died 2 June 2013)
 Maurice Lee - guitar, drums, vocals (1967-1998); (born 12 May 1946, Leeds)
 Carl Sutcliffe - guitar, keyboards, vocals (1967-1987)
 Albert Sutcliffe - keyboards, drums, vocals (1967-1987); (born 22 December 1940, Leeds)
 Phillip Hall (1967)
 Tony Jo (1997)
 Sharky (dancer)

References

External links
 

British comedy musical groups
Musical groups from Leeds